Khurja Junction railway station is a railway station at Khurja in Bulandshahr district on the North Central Railway network. It is an important station on the New Delhi–Aligarh–Kanpur main line.

Dedicated Freight Corridor (DFC) 
Dadri railway station on the Western Dedicated Freight Corridor (Western DFC) will be connected with Khurja railway station on Eastern Dedicated Freight Corridor (Eastern DFC) via a 46 km long branch line, for movement of Freight trains only. Both DFCs are under-construction.

Routes
The Delhi–Meerut–Saharanpur line passes through here. The following NCR's dedicated freight corridor will pass through here:
 Panipat–Rohtak line, via Panipat–Gohana–Rohtak, existing
 Rewari–Rohtak line, via Rohtak–Jhajjar–Rewari, existing
 Rewari–Khurja line, via Rewari–Palwal–Bhiwadi–Khurja, new rail line, survey completed
 Khurja–Meerut line, via Khurja–Bulandshahr–Hapur–Meerut, existing
 Meerut–Panipat line, new rail line, survey completed

References 

Railway stations in Bulandshahr district
Railway junction stations in Uttar Pradesh
Allahabad railway division
Khurja